Walter Patterson is the name of:
Walter Patterson (governor) (1735 or 1742 – 1798), colonial governor
Walter Patterson (U.S. politician), U.S. Representative from New York
Walt Patterson, environmentalist